Bosmans is a Dutch and Afrikaans toponymic surname, meaning "woodmen". It is more common in Belgium (5,779 people in 2008) than in the Netherlands (779 people), where the form Bosman is more abundant (9,937 people).  People with this surname include:

Brigitte Bosmans (born 1965), Belgian swimmer
Henriëtte Bosmans (1895–1952), Dutch composer
Evelien Bosmans (born 1989), Belgian actress
Fernand Bosmans (1883–1960), Belgian fencer
 (1852–1928), Belgian mathematician and historian
 (1856–1896), Dutch cellist
Johanna Bosmans (born c.1950), Belgian racing cyclist 
Juul Bosmans (1914–2000), Belgian hurdler
Kris Bosmans (born 1980), Belgian racing cyclist 
 (1922–2012), Belgian priest and author
Sarah Bosmans-Benedicts (1861–1949), Dutch pianist
Wietse Bosmans (born 1991), Belgian racing cyclist

See also
Bosman

References

Dutch-language surnames
Surnames of Belgian origin
Occupational surnames
Toponymic surnames